Turbonilla heilprini is a species of sea snail, a marine gastropod mollusk in the family Pyramidellidae, the pyrams and their allies.

Description
The shell grows to a length of about 2.8 mm.
The small shell is very slender, and gradually tapered. Its color is white. It is semitransparent, and very lustrous. The 1½ nearly flat whorls of the protoconch are prominent, slightly oblique and slightly projecting. The eight whorls of the teleoconch are moderately convex. The suture is distinct, and straight.  The transverse ribs number about 18. They are straight, nearly perpendicular, clean-cut, and rounded. They are separated by equally wide, deep spaces terminating at the periphery of the body whorl with square-cut ends. The base of the shell is well-rounded, and smooth. The outer lip is broken. The inner lip is thickened. There are no microscopic striae.

Distribution
This species occurs in the Atlantic Ocean off Bermuda at a depth of 4 meters.

References

External links
 To Biodiversity Heritage Library (3 publications)
 To Encyclopedia of Life
 To World Register of Marine Species

heilprini
Gastropods described in 1899